Smile is the sixth studio album by American singer Katy Perry. It was released on August 28, 2020, by Capitol Records, three years after its predecessor Witness (2017). Perry worked with various producers on the album, such as Josh Abraham, Carolina Liar, the Daylights, G Koop, Andrew Goldstein, Oligee, Oscar Görres, Oscar Holter, Ilya, Ian Kirkpatrick, the Monsters & Strangerz, Charlie Puth, Stargate and Zedd. She described Smile as her "journey towards the light, with stories of resilience, hope, and love". Primarily a pop record, Smile is characterized by themes of self-help and empowerment.

Three singles were released from the album: "Daisies", the lead single, was released on May 15, 2020, and peaked at number 40 on the U.S. Billboard Hot 100; it was followed by "Smile", and "Not the End of the World". Smile also contains Perry's 2019 standalone singles "Never Really Over" and "Harleys in Hawaii" in its standard tracklist, while the Japanese and fan editions of the album further include her other preceding singles, "Small Talk" (2019) and "Never Worn White" (2020).

Upon release, Smile received mixed reviews from music critics, who thought the album is one of Perry's solid efforts but criticized its familiar lyrics and production. Commercially, Smile reached the top five in Australia, Canada, New Zealand, the United Kingdom, the United States, and the top 10 in Austria, Ireland, and Italy.

Background and conception
Katy Perry stated she was struggling with situational depression in 2017, following the underperformance of her fifth studio album Witness, public criticism of her, and breakup with then-boyfriend and current fiancé Orlando Bloom; she conceived Smile during this period. In March 2018, Ian Kirkpatrick announced he had worked with Perry on new music. In an interview with The Fader, he stated: "We did a couple of days and she is amazing." He further stated that working with Perry was "someone I've wanted to work with my whole life, and she was literally the most normal, no-ego person." In 2019, she released the singles "Never Really Over", "Harleys in Hawaii" and "Small Talk".

In March 2020, Perry revealed her pregnancy with Bloom, via the music video for her single "Never Worn White". The pregnancy  influenced Smile as well. Perry also announced her intentions of releasing "a lot" of new music during the year's summer. In May, she announced "Daisies" as the lead single of her new album. The same month, Amazon Alexa announced the album's release date as August 14, 2020. In a June 2020 interview with Billboard, Perry discussed a new song, titled "Teary Eyes". She later confirmed the following month that "Never Really Over" would be on the album. The same month, the album's title was confirmed as Smile, after one of the songs on the album.

Theme and artwork
Perry explained that Smile is about "finding the light at the end of the tunnel", and taking back your smile, and that the album comes from a place where she fell in after her career and relationship with Orlando Bloom hit a low point back in 2017. She discussed struggles with depression and suicidal thoughts, and stated that gratitude is what saved her life. Perry also defined the album as her "journey towards the light, with stories of resilience, hope, and love". The album's artwork features Perry as "a glum clown with a red nose and a blue and white checkered suit above the title, Smile". The fan edition comes with a lenticular cover

Release and promotion

The singer unveiled the cover artwork of Smile via a Twitter game that involved her fans/followers tweeting about the album to "pop virtual balloons in order to uncover" the album cover. On July 27, 2020, she announced that the album release date had been pushed back two weeks due to "unavoidable production delays". In August 2020, she announced a limited edition collection of vinyl picture discs and alternative CD packaging for the album. Five alternative covers/vinyl picture discs were available for pre-order for a period of 5 days. Smile was also released as a bone white vinyl,  a picture disc, a cassette, and a limited deluxe edition CD with a lenticular cover, titled the "Fan edition."

Smile was released on August 28, 2020. A series of animated music videos titled The Smile Video Series was released, which featured animated music videos for seven songs from Smile. Each video showcased a different style of animation, with one being released each day between August 26 and September 1, 2020. On November 9, 2020, Perry performed "Never Really Over" and "Not the End of the World" as a part of her setlist for the TMall Double 11 Gala. She performed "Only Love" with Darius Rucker at the American Music Awards of 2020 on November 22, 2020. It marked her first televised performance after giving birth to her first child, Daisy Dove Bloom. A remix of the track "Cry About It Later", featuring Luísa Sonza and Bruno Martini, was released on April 24, 2021, alongside a lyric video. She also included the solo version of song in her setlist at the Lazada Super Party. Many songs from the album were performed at Perry's 2021-2022 Las Vegas Residency, Play.

Singles

Throughout 2019 and 2020, Perry released four solo songs, originally marketed as standalone singles. "Never Really Over", released on May 31, 2019, was announced to be on Smile by Perry in June 2020. "Harleys in Hawaii" was revealed to be on the standard track list upon the release of the album pre-order. "Small Talk" and "Never Worn White" did not make the standard track list, but ended up as bonus tracks on the "Fan" and Japanese editions of the album.

"Daisies" was released on May 15, 2020, as the album's lead single. It debuted at number 40 on the US Billboard Hot 100.

"Smile," the title track, was released as the second single on July 10, 2020, along with the album pre-order.

Perry then released "What Makes a Woman" as a promotional single ahead of the album, on August 20, 2020. She released an acoustic version exclusive to her Vevo page on the same day, and revealed that the track is dedicated to her daughter.

"Cry About It Later" was released as a promotional single for the record on August 28, 2020. In April 2021, Perry released a remix of this song with Brazilian DJ, Bruno Martini, who remixed the song and featured vocals from Brazilian singer Luísa Sonza.

On November 17, 2020, a remix of "Resilient" featuring Tiësto and Aitana was released as the album's second promotional single. A music video was released for the remix on the same day, and is a part of the Open To Better campaign by Coca-Cola.

"Not the End of the World" was released on December 21, 2020, as the third single from the album. A music video for the track was released to YouTube on the same day, which stars Zooey Deschanel.

Critical reception

Smile received mixed reviews from critics, who deemed it a "relatively solid album", but criticized its familiar sound and "cliched" lyrics. At Metacritic, which assigns a normalized rating out of 100 to reviews from publications, the Smile received a weighted average score of 58, based on 18 reviews, indicating "mixed or average reviews". AnyDecentMusic? gave the album 5.3 out of 10, based on their assessment of the critical consensus.

Lindsay Zolandz of The New York Times thought that Smile tries to add brightness to the dark, with a lightness that was absent in its predecessor, Witness (2017). Mark Kennedy of Chicago Tribune deemed the album a course-correction that sets Perry back into pure pop, and labeled most of the album "bit of a bummer" due its apologetic tone. The i newspaper's Joe Muggs complimented the restrained production and Perry's maturation as a pop star, but dismissed the lyrical content as "bit too much self-help book redemption". Writing for The Daily Telegraph, Kate Solomon noted that Smile feels very "so earnest that it strays into cringe-worthy territory", but displays the strongest traits of Perry's music: "fizzy bops" and huge hooks.

USA Today writer Patrick Ryan opined that Smile exudes newfound joy, with some of the most carefree songs of the singer's career. However, he criticized the self-empowerment lyrics as clichéd, adding that Perry gives listeners a déjà vu rather than seeking a new musical direction. Leah Greenblatt of Entertainment Weekly described the album's sound as too familiar, unaltered from Perry's older discography. Craig Jenkins of Vulture found Smile to be lyrically weak, but overall an improvement over Witness, and named the singles as its best tracks. Alexa Camp from Slant Magazine wrote that Perry avoids experimentation by opting to stay "in her lane". Kish Lal of The Sydney Morning Herald branded Smile as falling flat despite the honesty in subjects dealt. Louise Bruton of The Irish Times asserted that the album possesses perfect melodies, but criticized the lyrics as "subpar".

In unfavorable reviews, Pitchfork writer Dani Blum dubbed Smile as cliché-ridden pop with confusing platitudes, that is also inapt for the COVID-19 pandemic. The A.V. Clubs Alex McLevy opined that Perry is "struggling to be taken seriously", as Smile holds back her ability to evolve, instead of the intended showcase of the singer's "real" side. Stereogum's Chris DeVille wrote the record was dull and unadventurous, and did not believe the lyricism was memorable, while Helen Brown of The Independent called the album forgettable, and found the singer resorting to basics. Hannah Mylrea of NME wrote that the album comprises lackluster imitations and fillers, devoid of the catchy hooks and couplets of Perry's older records. Writing for Clash, Joe Rivers felt Smile lacked substance, and called the production outdated.

Commercial performance

Smile debuted at number five on the US Billboard 200 chart, marking Perry's fifth top-10 album and her first album since One of the Boys (2008) to not reach number one. It opened with 50,000 album equivalent units, of which 35,000 were sales, 14,000 were streaming-equivalent units (translating to 21 million on-demand streams) and 2,000 track-equivalent units. Smile fell 49 spots to number 54 in its second week, and placed at number 104 in the third week. It charted its fourth week on the Billboard 200 at number 160, following which it exited the chart. As of March 2021, Smile has sold 67,000 pure copies and accumulated 402,000 units in the United States.

Smile opened at number five on the Canadian Albums Chart and UK Albums Chart, earning 8,579 units in the latter. It entered at number nine on the Irish Albums Chart, marking Perry's fifth consecutive top-10 album in Ireland. Smile debuted at number two on Australia's ARIA Albums Chart, blocked from number one by Metallica's live album S&M2 (2020). It landed at number four on New Zealand's Top 40 Albums Chart, and number 39 on Japan's Oricon Albums chart. Smile debuted and peaked at number 14 in Germany.

Track listing

Notes and samples
  – main and vocal production
  – vocal production 
  – additional production
  – production for the remixed version
 "Never Really Over" contains interpolations from "Love You Like That", written by Dagny Sandvik, Jason Gill, Michelle Buzz.
 "Not the End of the World" contains elements from "Na Na Hey Hey Kiss Him Goodbye", written by Paul Leka, Gary DeCarlo, Dale Frashuer.
 "Smile" contains samples from "Jamboree", written by Anthony Criss, Benny Golson, Vincent Brown, Kier Gist. 
 Vinyl pressings of the album feature an alternative version of "Smile" featuring Diddy, with additional writers Sean Combs and Cordae Dunston.

Personnel
Adapted from the album liner notes.

Performance

 Katy Perry – vocals (all tracks), background vocals (2)
 Leah Haywood – background vocals (1)
 Hayley Warner – background vocals (1)
 Gino Barletta – background vocals (1)
 Sasha Alex Sloan – background vocals (2)
 Noonie Bao – background vocals (2)
 Andrew Goldstein – background vocals (3)
 Jacob Kasher Hindlin – background vocals (3)
 Michael Pollack – background vocals (3, 6)
 Madison Love – background vocals (3, 6)
 Jon Bellion – background vocals (4)
 Kamaria Anita Ousley – background vocals (7)
 Charlie Puth – background vocals (10, 15)
 Johan Carlsson –  background vocals (10)
 Sophie Frances Cooke – background vocals (11)
 Ilya Salmanzadeh – background vocals (14)
 Savan Kotecha – background vocals (14)
 Sachi DiSerafino – gang vocals (11)
 Lila Drew – gang vocals (11)
 Karissa Reynafarje – gang vocals (11)
 John DeBold – gang vocals (11)
 Elvira Anderfjärd – background vocals (12)

Musicians

 Oscar Holter – drums, bass, keyboards (2)
 Rickard Göransson – guitars (2)
 Andrew Goldstein – guitars, drums, bass, percussion (3); keyboards (3, 6)
 Oscar Görres – drums, bass, percussion (3); keyboards (3, 6)
 Michael Pollack – synthesizers (3), guitars (4), piano (6)
 Pierre Luc Rioux – guitars (4, 17)
 Mikkel S. Eriksen – all instruments (5)
 Tor Hermansen – all instruments (5)
 Lincoln Adler – saxophone (7)
 Dave Richards – trumpet (7)
 David Bukovinszky – cello (8, 16)
 Johan Carlsson – keyboards (8, 9), strings arrangement (8), guitars (10, 15), Fender Rhodes (10), acoustic guitar, shaker, electric guitar (12); synthesizers (12, 15), talking, drum programming (15); piano (16)
 Mattias Bylund – string synthesizer (8), horns arrangement, synthesizer horns (9); strings, strings arrangement (16)
 Nils–Petter Ankarblom – string synthesizer, strings arrangement (8); horns arrangement (9)
 Mattias Johansson – violin (8, 16)
 Tomas Jonsson – tenor saxophone, baritone saxophone (9)
 Peter Noos Johansson – trombone, tuba (9)
 Magnus Johansson – trumpets (9)
 Janne Bjerger – trumpets (9)
 Wojtek Goral – alto saxophone (9)
 Charlie Puth – synthesizers (10, 15)
 Brad Oberhofer – Rhodes, organ, piano (11)
 John DeBold – guitar, synthesizers, arrangement, vocal chops (11)
 Elvira Anderfjärd – electric guitar, organ, bass, drums, (12)
 John Ryan – electric guitar (12)
 Ilya – arrangement, keyboards, bass, drums, percussion (14)
 Ferras – keyboards (14)

Technical

 Dave Kutch – mastering
 Oliver Heldens – mastering (18)
 Zedd – mixing (1)
 Serban Ghenea – mixing (2–6, 8–12, 14, 16, 17)
 Manny Marroquin – mixing (7)
 Phil Tan – mixing (15)
 Ryan Shanahan – engineering, additional mixing (1)
 Brian Cruz – assistant engineering (1)
 Sam Holland – engineering (2, 8–10, 12, 14–16)
 Cory Bice – engineering (2, 8–10, 12, 14, 16)
 Jeremy Lertola – engineering (2, 8–10, 12, 14, 16), assistant recording engineering (15)
 John Hanes – mix engineering (2–6, 8–12, 14, 16, 17)
 Rachael Findlen – engineering (3, 4, 6, 8, 10, 15, 17)
 Andrew Goldstein – vocals recording (3, 6)
 The Monsters & Strangerz – vocals recording (4)
 Mikkel S. Eriksen – engineering (5)
 Thomas Warren – engineering (5)
 Louie Gomez – engineering (7)
 Blake Harden – engineering (7)
 CJ Mixed It – engineering (7)
 Darth "Denver" Moon – engineering (7)
 Chris Galland – mix engineering (7)
 Robin Florent – assistant engineering (7)
 Scott Desmarais – assistant engineering (7)
 Mattias Bylund – strings recording and editing (8), horns recording and editing (9)
 John DeBold – engineering (11)
 Bill Zimmerman – engineering (15)
 Peter Karlsson – vocal editing (15)
 Zedd – programming (1)
 Daniel James – programming (1)
 Leah Haywood – programming (1)
 Oscar Holter – programming (2)
 Andre Goldstein programming (3, 6)
 Oscar Görres – programming (3, 6)
 Mikkel S. Eriksen – programming (5)
 Tor Hermansen – programming (5)
 Johan Carlsson – programming (8-10, 12, 16), drum programming (15)
 Charlie Puth – programming (10), drum programming (15)
 John DeBold – drum programming,  synthesizer programming, string programming (11)
 Elvira Anderfjärd – programming (12)
 Ilya – programming (14)
 Rami – programming (16)

Artwork

 Nicole Frantz – art direction
 Christine Hahn – photography
 Nick Steinhardt – design

Charts

Weekly charts

Year-end charts

Certifications and sales

Release history

References

2020 albums
Capitol Records albums
Katy Perry albums
Albums produced by Dreamlab
Albums produced by Josh Abraham
Albums produced by Johan Carlsson